Otkritie may refer to:
Otkritie FC Bank
Otkritie Holding
Otkritie Arena